The 1869 Hastings by-election was fought on 18 November 1869.  The by-election was fought due to the death of the incumbent MP of the Liberal Party, Frederick North.  It was won by the Liberal candidate Ughtred James Kay-Shuttleworth.

References

1869 elections in the United Kingdom
1869 in England
19th century in Sussex
Hastings
By-elections to the Parliament of the United Kingdom in Sussex constituencies
November 1869 events